MEO is a mobile and fixed telecommunications service and brand from Altice Portugal (formerly Portugal Telecom), managed by MEO - Serviços de Comunicações e Multimédia. The service was piloted in Lisbon in 2006 and was later extended to Porto and Castelo Branco.

History 
MEO in its current form was founded in 2007 after the separation of PT Comunicações and PT Multimédia (later ZON Multimédia). While PT Multimédia employed coaxial cables, after separation, MEO started making use of copper cables. The television service supplied by MEO within the copper cable network is served on the ADSL line. Telecomunicações Móveis Nacionais (TMN), Portugal's first and largest mobile network operator, was later integrated into the MEO brand in 2014 after two of TMN's shareholders, Telefones de Lisboa e Porto (TLP) and Marconi Comunicações Internacionais (the Portuguese operations of the UK-based Marconi Company) were acquired by Portugal Telecom in 1994 and 2002 respectively.

The commercial launch of the ADSL2+ service took place in June 2007. The satellite service began in April 2008, using the Hispasat satellite, soon followed by the FTTH service. The ADSL2+ and FTTH offers reached across Portugal and included broadband Internet services (at up to 400Mbit/s) as well as a telephone service.

In May 2009, PT Comunicações announced, after digital terrestrial television (TDT) transmissions had started, that the triple play service was also available with fiber optic speeds can achieve 400 Mbit/s.

Another service that rely on TDT, MEO TDT, which is included in the 3G plates service that is captured through the mobile internet signals from TDT. This service included one High Definition (HD) channel and the five main Portuguese channels: RTP1, RTP2, SIC, TVI and ARTV. MEO TDT service also allows some of the advantages found on the ADSL and Fiber Optic service (pause, record...).

In July 2010, Portugal Telecom informed that MEO had surpassed 700 thousand clients.

In November 2011, MEO achieved one million subscribers. In January 2014, MEO and TMN became a single brand, MEO Serviços de Comunicações e Multimédia S.A..

In 2013, MEO launched a quadruple play service called M4O that in addition to the functionalities already referred has added the mobile phone, in a converged strategic logic. In July 2014, MEO launched a bundle which also includes the offering of mobile internet, called M5O.

Chronology 
1991
Created on 22 March to take on the only existing mobile service in Portugal, based on an analogue network launched in 1989 by TLP (Lisbon and Oporto's phone service) and CTT (Portuguese Postal Service/national phone service), both State companies. The network prefix was 0676.
In December, Marconi (Portuguese international phone service, also a State company) bought into the company; ownership became equally split among the three partners.
1992
 In March, regulatory agency ICP-Instituto das Comunicações de Portugal (Communications Institute of Portugal) announced the winners of the public bids for two licenses for mobile services through GSM. One winner was TMN; the second winner was a private consortium formed for the bid, called Telecel (later bought by Vodafone).
 In May, the first GSM call was placed. Prefix was 0936.
 On 8 October the GSM service was commercially launched.
1993
 In May, the first roaming call was made.  
 In October, TMN launched the voice mail service for free to all customers.  
1994
 TMN was incorporated into Portugal Telecom, the State-run telecom born from the merger of TLP, Marconi and Telecom Portugal (spin-off from CTT).
1995
 Inauguration, in February, of the digital network in the Madeira island.
 In September, launch of MIMO, the world's first prepaid mobile service.
1996
 In April, a new logo was presented.
In June, launch of SPOT, a prepaid tariff for younger customers.
 In July, inauguration of the digital network in the Azores. 
1998
In April, TMN was the first Portuguese operator to adopt billing by the second as imposed by law.
TMN reached one million customers.
In September, third GSM competitor was launched: Optimus (now NOS).
1999
 TMN reached two million customers. It got its second million customers in just one year, as opposed to nine years for the first million.
ICP granted to TMN a license for Fixed phone services, with prefix 1096. TMN would only offer this service to its corporate customers, backed on its parent company's landline network.
2000
 Prefix of TMN was changed to 96 as part of an overall restructuring of the national numbering system.
2003
 In June, TMN launched a mobile portal, i9 (pronounced innov), on the trail of Vodafone live!, launched in November 2005.
2005
 On 28 September TMN introduced a new logo, shown above.
2014
 In January it was reported that Portugal Telecom will discontinue TMN brand and merge it with Meo.
2017
 From 31 October the carrier name on the iPhone changed to altice MEO

Marketing 
The communication campaign invested in a strong advertising effort, protagonized by Portuguese humoristic characters, the Gato Fedorento.

Service 
MEO's technology transmits over fiber optic and ADSL—either television (IPTV), telephone (VOIP) and internet. MEO ADSL integrates a router with a switch, connected to the telephone plug to decode and distribute the signal, and another for the television called MEOBox. The two MEOBox models are built by Motorola and Scientific Atlanta, with a processor, optional hard drive, HDMI slot, two SCART slots, a digital sound slot and an Ethernet slot.

The MEO Fiber Optic service uses an Optical Network Terminal, that decodes the fiber optic signal and passes it to the router.

Television 
MEO offers television content transmission through four platforms: the ADSL network (IPTV), fiber optic (IPTV), satellite (DTH) and the 3G/4G network inherited from mobile communications carrier TMN, added to MEO in January 2014.

MEO ADSL television service includes a basic slate of 120 TV channels. Subscribers can access more than 170 channels if purchasing the “MEO Total” bundle, which included HD channels. FTTH MEO offers bundles distinguished by the speed of data transmission. Just like MEO ADSL, the basic package includes 120 channels.

With IPTV channels can be purchased through the MEObox remote control, unlike the satellite and coax services. Another advantage is its speed of 200 milliseconds.

The IPTV network also enables the customer to play games in the MEOBox and to explore content from the internet and dozens of interactive apps. The programming schedule is available along with a “PIP” (Picture In Picture) showing other channels onscreen alongside the current selection. It is also possible to record and pause the show being live transmitted or even watching what was transmitted on the last 7 days (automatic recordings.
In geographies where fiber-optic or ADSL networks are not available, MEO offers a television service by satellite. 
The anywhere MEO's TV solution is called MEO Go.

MEO VideoClube 
MEO VideoClube is a video-on-demand service that offers a catalog of thousands of Portuguese and international programs (including movies, documentaries and concerts). Additional features available include trailers, synopses, cast and IMDb rating; a favorites list; 48-hour viewing window; renting HD/3D movies with dolby surround sound; total control and privacy through a security PIN for “rentals and purchases” and a security PIN to access adult content. MEO VideoClube can be used inside or outside home on televisions, tablets; smartphones or personal computers through MEO Go service; and connected TV's and game consoles.

It is possible to watch movies without an internet connection, using Download & Play, available on a PC through MEO Go. In 2014, the services was refreshed with an improved image, faster navigation and new features with  additional content and information, and a more accessible user experience. MEO VideoClube offers multiple payment options including a monthly invoice and the prepaid MEO VideoClube card.

MEO Go 
MEO Go allows viewers to watch live TV and video on demand content on Windows, Mac and mobile devices such as tablets and smartphones via any 3G/4G broadband or WiFi internet connection. MEO Go offers over 70 TV live channels; automatic recording,; thousands of movies; and access to a programming guide (Guia TV) that contains detailed program information and allows scheduling alerts and remote recordings. The MEO Go free app is available for the Android, iOS, Windows Phone and Windows 8 operating systems. The service is available at no extra cost to MEO TV customers, via MEO's home WiFi; or via any 3G/4G and WiFi internet access.

Since MEO Go's launch, in November 2011, the service added:
 Download movies to watch later without internet access  (August 2012)
 MEO Go app for Windows 8 (October 2012)
 Automatic recording (January 2013)
 Tablet (February 2013) and iPhone and iPod Touch (February 2014) apps with a remote control, social network integration and a share-to-TV feature, to send contents form the mobile device to the TV
In 2013 MEO Go had more than 100.000 monthly active users, and more than 500.000 app downloads. Worldwide, it was recognized as one of the most complete and innovative platforms of its kind, winning international awards, including the CSI Awards 2014  and the Stevie Awards 2014.

Internet 
The ADSL Internet service offers 24 Mbit/s downstream and 1 Mbit/s for upstream without traffic limitation, nationally or internationally. The fiber optic network allows downstream speeds up to 400 Mbit/s and 100Mbit/s downstream for a higher data allocation. In 2015 mobile internet was added, named M5O.

Telephone 
The telephone service offers charge free calls without limit to all national fixed networks. Initial costs are integrated in the MEO service subscription.

Mobile phone 
Mobile phone service is supplied through the TMN networks. Following the demise of the TMN brand, tariffs remained unchanged and the telephonic support line (1696) remained the same as well. In 2015 telephone service was included in a quadruple play pack, named M4O.

Channels 

The television channel line-up includes the Portuguese versions of international channels such as:
AXN
FOX
Syfy
MTV
Disney Channel
National Geographic Channel
Love Nature
MSNBC
Fox News
CNN International
Russia Today
Al Jazeera English
Eurosport
BBC World News
DW-TV
BBC Earth
Rai Italia

European football club television channels include:
Barça TV
Benfica TV
Chelsea TV
Manchester United TV
Real Madrid TV
Sporting TV
Wion Tv
Zee Documentary

Sponsorship 
MEO sponsored all the "Big Three" from the Primeira Liga (Benfica, Porto and Sporting) from 2005 to 2015. However it started sponsoring Porto again, as well as Rio Ave and Desportivo das Aves. It is also a sponsor of the Portuguese Football Federation. It also sponsors athletes such as footballer Cristiano Ronaldo, Moto GP racer Miguel Oliveira, surfer Frederico Morais and World Surf League event MEO Rip Curl Pro Portugal.

Net neutrality dispute

A MEO advertisement for data access was the focus of a discussion beginning in October 2017 in Portugal, the European Union and the United States and relating to net neutrality.

MEO posted their advertisement for Internet services on their own website. On 26 October 2017, Democratic Party U.S. Representative Ro Khanna posted a screenshot of MEO's website to his Twitter feed while stating that their sales model was a violation of net neutrality and bad.

Following Khanna's message, the technology community at Reddit discussed it on 27 October. Net neutrality advocate Cory Doctorow featured the ad as an illustration of a net neutrality violation on Boing Boing on 28 October. Quartz reported that the ad showed a net neutrality violation on 30 October. Tim Wu, the legal scholar who defined the term "net neutrality", commented on 30 October after reading the Quartz article that the ad did show a violation of net neutrality. From this point the discussion was far ranging. By 22 November, MEO published a response to the attention.

Responses
Many media sources reported that the sales model which the image described was a bad thing for being a violation of net neutrality.

Some other media sources reported that many people are misunderstanding the image. To clarify, these sources reported that MEO's sales model is aligned with Portuguese and European law, and that law defines net neutrality in a way that permits MEO's sales model. In another clarification point, sources noted that the MEO ad is for services to mobile phones and not an additional fee to broadband service (cf. EU Regulation 2015/2120).

References

External links
 
Channel and transponder list
Contentious advertisement

Altice Portugal
2007 establishments in Portugal
Digital television
Internet service providers of Portugal
Streaming television
Mobile phone companies of Portugal
Television in Portugal